All the Best Cowboys Have Chinese Eyes is the third solo studio album by English rock musician Pete Townshend, released on 14 June 1982 by Atco Records. Chris Thomas produced the album (who had also produced Townshend's previous album, Empty Glass) and it was recorded by Bill Price at three separate recording studios in London, England, which were Eel Pie, A.I.R. and Wessex. The album peaked at No. 32 on the UK Albums Chart, and at No. 26 on the US Billboard 200.

All the Best Cowboys Have Chinese Eyes contains some compositions that were salvaged from later albums by his band the Who, and was released just under three months before their album It's Hard.

Recording and production
Along with the 11 songs on the album, other songs were also recorded, including "Body Language" (subsequently released in 1983 on Scoop), a track called "Man Watching" (released as the B-side of "Face Dances, Pt. 2"), and "Dance It Away" (which was also performed in various forms live by the Who between 1979 and 1981, usually as a coda to "Dancing in the Street"), and which was released as the B-side of "Uniforms". One further song "Vivienne" was listed on the cover of some early LP copies but not released at the time. This, along with "Man Watching" and "Dance It Away", were released as bonus tracks on the 2006 reissue.

Album title
Townshend explained the album title as referring to the "average American hero – somebody like a Clint Eastwood or a John Wayne. Somebody with eyes like slits..."

On the Listening Time promotional LP, Townshend said he should have won a "Stupid Title of the Year" award.

Video release
A companion video was also released, featuring concept videos set to the musical backings of "Prelude", "Face Dances, Pt. 2", "Communication", "Uniforms", "Stardom in Acton", "Exquisitely Bored", and a re-recorded version of "Slit Skirts", with a harmonica performance on the last song, not used on the studio cut.

Chalkie Davis, the director (with Carol Starr) of the video, said:

This has been out of print for years, though Pete Townshend put the videos up on his website in 2000, which were then subsequently uploaded to other sites on the Internet.

Critical reception

All the Best Cowboys Have Chinese Eyes was panned by most music critics upon its release. In a contemporary review for the Village Voice, Robert Christgau found it "pretentious at an unprecedented level of difficulty" and said that Townshend twisted "such long words into such unlikely rhymes and images and marshal arrangements of such intricate meaninglessness." Stereo Review called it an "ambitious failure" and felt that Townshend tends to indulge in his ideas on rock music and life on his songs. In a positive review for Rolling Stone, Jon Pareles called the album "a mess of contradictions", but an exceptional listen because of Townshend's arrangements, which "surge and subside as gracefully as anything in rock; they're neither static nor jolting."

In a retrospective review for AllMusic, Stephen Thomas Erlewine called it the type of album that "taunts cynics and critics, being nearly impenetrable in its content even if the production and the music itself aren't all that inaccessible." Stylus Magazines Justin Cober-Lake said that the album "might at times be convoluted or over-thought," but "remains affecting and compelling" because of Townshend's sincere lyrics.

Rob Hughes of Classic Rock included The Sea Refuses No River in a list of the top 10 most underrated Pete Townshend songs.

Track listing

Personnel
Credits are adapted from the All the Best Cowboys Have Chinese Eyes liner notes.Musicians Pete Townshend – vocals; guitars; keyboards (Prophet 5–10 Synthesizer, Arp 2500 and Synclavier)
 Virginia Astley – piano
 Tony Butler – bass guitar
 Peter Hope-Evans – harmonica
 Mark Brzezicki – drums
 Simon Phillips – drums
 Jody Linscott – percussion
 Chris Stainton – additional keyboards
 Poli Palmer – tuned percussion
 John Lewis – Fairlight CMI programming
 Ann Odell – brass arrangement on "The Sea Refuses No River"Technical Chris Thomas – producer
 Bill Price – engineer
 Mark Freegard – assistant engineer
 Tim Young – mastering engineerArtwork'
 Carol Starr – photography
 Chalkie Davis – photography
 Richard Evans – Typography, calligraphy and graphics
 Michael Spry – photographic prints
 Ike King – hair
 Jacqui Lefton – makeup
 Kenny McDonald – tailor

Charts

References

External links

1982 albums
Pete Townshend albums
New wave albums by English artists
Albums produced by Chris Thomas (record producer)
Atco Records albums